The 65th Evening Standard Theatre Awards were awarded in recognition of the 2018–19 London Theatre season on 24 November 2019 at the London Coliseum. Nominations were announced on 4 November 2019. The ceremony was presented by Cush Jumbo and co-hosted by Evgeny Lebedev, Damian Lewis, Helen McCrory and Anna Wintour.

Eligibility and nomination process 
All new productions and performances on the London stage between 20 October 2018 and 10 October 2019 were eligible for consideration.

Ceremony

Presenters 

 Ruth Wilson presented Best Actor
 Damian Lewis presented the Natasha Richardson Award for Best Actress
 Taron Egerton presented Best Musical
 Michael Kors and Gugu Mbatha-Raw presented Best Design
 Trevor Nunn presented the Editor’s Award
 Glenda Jackson presented the Lebedev Award

Performances 

 10 students from the Brit School performed "Windy City"
 Sam Tutty performed "Waving Through A Window" from Dear Evan Hansen
 Miriam-Teak Lee and the & Juliet cast performed "Roar"

Sponsors 
The headline sponsor was Michael Kors, and the following awards were presented in partnership:

 Best Play was awarded in partnership with Chanel
 Best Actor was awarded in partnership with the Ambassador Theatre Group
 The Natasha Richardson Award for Best Actress was awarded in partnership with Christian Louboutin
 Best Design was awarded in partnership with Michael Kors
 Emerging Talent was awarded in partnership with Access Entertainment

Bottega Veneta and Burberry were also partners of the event.

Non-competitive awards 
The Lebedev Award went to Peter Brook for his contribution to theatre, accepted by his daughter Irina Brook.

The Editor’s Award went to Ian McKellen for his On Stage tour.

Winners and nominees

Multiple nominations 
4 nominations

 Downstate

2 nominations

 Betrayal
 Death of a Salesman
 The Doctor
 Faith, Hope and Charity
 Fiddler on the Roof
 Sweet Charity

See also 

 2019 Laurence Olivier Awards
 2020 Laurence Olivier Awards

References 

Evening Standard Theatre Awards ceremonies
2019 theatre awards
2019 awards in the United Kingdom
November 2019 events in the United Kingdom